Prohylesia is a genus of moths in the family Saturniidae first described by Max Wilhelm Karl Draudt in 1929.

Species
Prohylesia friburgensis (Schaus, 1915)
Prohylesia peruviana Lemaire, 1982
Prohylesia rosalinda Draudt, 1929
Prohylesia zikani Draudt, 1929

References

Hemileucinae